SWINE is a film written and directed by film-makers and campaigners Robbie Lockie and Damien Clarkson. The film is their first collaboration under the name Growing Box Co. and it has been commissioned by the charity Viva! (Viva! or Vegetarians' International Voice for Animals, is a British animal rights group) as part of their ongoing campaign 'FaceOff'. The film suggests we are sleepwalking into a superbug pandemic. The film will be released online on 7 July 2016 and there will be a London screening.

Plot 

The film sees journalist Jack Tomlins (portrayed by runner Tim Shieff) go undercover in a UK factory farm to investigate rumours of a MRSA superbug outbreak in the pig population. In his search for the truth, he makes some shocking discoveries and all hangs in the balance.

Reception
The film attracted some support from high-profile supporters actors Matt Lucas and Nicholas Hoult both tweeted about the film and expressed their support for its message.

Juliet Gellatley, Viva! founder and director wrote in HuffPost where she asks are we facing the future of antibiotic resistance?

See also
 List of British films of 2016

References

External links
 

British short documentary films
Criticism of fast food
Films about animal rights
2010s English-language films
2010s British films
2016 short documentary films